On September 11, 2001, 19 al-Qaeda terrorists took control of four commercial aircraft and used them as suicide weapons in a series of four coordinated acts of terrorism to strike the World Trade Center in New York City, The Pentagon in Arlington County, Virginia, and an additional target in Washington, D.C. Two aircraft hit the World Trade Center while the third hit the Pentagon. A fourth plane did not arrive at its target, but crashed into a field in Pennsylvania after a passenger revolt. The intended target is believed to have been the United States Capitol. As a result, 2,977 victims were killed, making it the deadliest foreign attack on U.S. soil, exceeding Japan's surprise attack on Pearl Harbor in Honolulu, Hawaii, on December 7, 1941, which killed 2,335 members of the United States Armed Forces and 68 civilians. The effort was carefully planned by al-Qaeda, which sent 19 terrorists to take over Boeing 757 and Boeing 767 aircraft, operated by American Airlines and United Airlines.

Background
Al-Qaeda's origins date to 1979 when the Soviet Union invaded Afghanistan. Soon after the invasion, Osama bin Laden traveled to Afghanistan and helped organize Arab mujahideen. Together with Abdullah Azzam, a Palestinian-Jordanian who influenced bin Laden, they formed Maktab al-Khidamat (MAK) in 1984, to provide support for Arab mujahideen who came to join the jihad in Afghanistan.

Toward the end of the 1980s, the Soviets were retreating in defeat. Bin Laden and Azzam discussed the future of MAK and what to do with the mujahideen force that had built up. Bin Laden and Azzam both wanted to use the force as a "rapid reaction force" to defend oppressed Muslims around the world.  Bin Laden wanted to train the mujahideen in terrorist tactics, but Azzam strongly disagreed with this approach, issuing a fatwa saying that it would violate Islamic law.  Azzam reiterated the hadith that orders Muslims to kill no women or children.

In November 1989, soon after bin Laden and Azzam split, Azzam was killed in Peshawar, Pakistan.  Azzam and his two sons were travelling to Jummah (Friday prayer) when a remote-control-activated bomb detonated, killing them.  It is unknown for certain if bin Laden was behind this, but is thought unlikely. Nonetheless, bin Laden was then free to take full control of MAK, laying the groundwork for al-Qaeda. Under the guidance of Dr. Ayman al-Zawahiri, bin Laden became more radical.

In 1991, bin Laden moved to Sudan, where he led operations in East Africa, including the 1993 assault on U.S. troops at Mogadishu in Somalia.  Under Saudi and American pressure, the Sudanese forced bin Laden out of Sudan in 1996, and he returned to Afghanistan.

Ideology

The Iraqi invasion of Kuwait in 1990 marked a point where bin Laden turned attention toward the United States. He urged the Saudi regime not to host the 500,000 U.S. soldiers, instead advocating use of a mujaheddin force to oust the Iraqis. Bin Laden strongly opposed the continued presence of the U.S. Armed Forces in Saudi Arabia. He interpreted the Prophet Muhammad as banning the "permanent presence of kafirun (infidels) in Arabia". This drove bin Laden to attack U.S. military targets in Saudi Arabia. The date chosen for the 1998 Kenyan embassy bombings (August 7), was eight years to the day that American troops were sent to Saudi Arabia.

Bin Laden also stated that he viewed the House of Saud (the Saudi royal family) as apostates. In Islam, the charge of apostasy is made against Muslims who become non-believers and reject Islam. Bin Laden also objected to U.S. alliances with the governments of Kuwait, Jordan, and Egypt. He viewed Israelis as kafirun who are unwelcome in "Muslim land".  He objected to U.S. foreign policy in relation to Israel. He noted that key figures Madeleine Albright, Sandy Berger, and William Cohen, who were all Jewish, "drove Washington's undoubtedly pro-Israel policy" during the Clinton administration.

Fatwas
In 1996, bin Laden issued a fatwa, calling for the U.S. military to leave Saudi Arabia. In Islam, a fatwa can only be issued by an Islamic scholar; bin Laden, however, was a political fighter who used Islam to motivate his fighters. The 1998 U.S. Embassy bombings marked a turning point, with bin Laden intent on attacking the U.S. Bin Laden issued another fatwa in February 1998, together with Ayman al Zawahiri, declaring war against the U.S. He stated "We do not have to differentiate between military or civilian. As far as we are concerned, they [Americans] are all targets." Bin Laden cited grievances including the presence of U.S. kafirun (soldiers) in the Saudi Arabian holy land, the Iraqi people's suffering due to sanctions imposed after the Persian Gulf War, and U.S. support of Israel. In his December 1999 interview with Rahimullah Yusufzai, bin Laden reiterated his ideology and objected to U.S. military presence in Saudi Arabia. He proclaimed that the U.S. was "too near to Mecca", which he considered a provocation to the entire Muslim world. He also believed Israel "was killing and punishing Palestinians with American money and American arms."

Origins of the September 11 attacks
The attacks were influenced by the Bojinka plot, a terrorist operation planned by Khalid Sheikh Mohammed and his nephew Ramzi Yousef, who was responsible for the 1993 World Trade Center bombing. The plan would have included bombings of eleven trans-Pacific airliners and crashing a plane into the CIA Headquarters. Yousef tested the plan by planting a bomb aboard Philippine Airlines Flight 434 on December 11, 1994, which detonated but only killed one passenger. The plot was intercepted when Yousef's Manila apartment burned down and the Philippine National Police captured his laptop computer with the plans. Yousef himself was captured by U.S. and Pakistani forces in 1995.

Khalid Sheikh Mohammed presented a modified plan to bin Laden in 1996 in Afghanistan.  According to the 9/11 Commission, Khalid Sheikh Mohammed envisioned hijacking twelve airplanes on both the East and West coasts, and for eleven of them to crash into the World Trade Center and the Empire State Building in New York City; The Pentagon in Arlington, Virginia; the Prudential Tower in Boston, Massachusetts; the White House and the United States Capitol in Washington, D.C.; the Willis Tower (then Sears Tower) in Chicago, Illinois; the U.S. Bank Tower (then Library Tower) in Los Angeles, California; the Transamerica Pyramid in San Francisco, California; and the Columbia Center in Seattle, Washington. Nothing came of the idea at the time, however, as bin Laden rejected the plan as being too elaborate.

In December 1998, the Director of Central Intelligence Counterterrorist Center reported to President Bill Clinton that al-Qaeda was preparing for attacks in the U.S., including training personnel to hijack aircraft.

In late-1998 or early-1999, bin Laden summoned Khalid Sheikh Mohammed to Kandahar and gave his approval for him to proceed with a scaled back version of the "planes operation." A series of meetings occurred in the spring of 1999, involving Khalid Sheikh Mohammed, Osama bin Laden, and his deputy Mohammed Atef.  Khalid Sheikh Mohammed wanted to hit the World Trade Center, while bin Laden prioritized the White House, the U.S. Capitol, and the Pentagon because he believed that it would lead to the political collapse of the U.S. federal government. If any of the hijackers could not reach their intended targets, they were to crash the plane. Bin Laden recommended four individuals for the plot, including Nawaf al-Hazmi, Khalid al-Mihdhar, Walid Muhammad Salih Bin 'Attash (Khallad), and Abu Bara al-Taizi. Al-Hazmi and al-Mihdhar were both Saudi citizens, which made it straightforward for them to obtain U.S. visas, unlike Khallad and al-Taizi who both were Yemeni citizens, and as such unable to get visas to the U.S. easily.  The two Yemenis were assigned for the Asia component of the plot. When Mohamed Atta and other members of the Hamburg cell arrived in Afghanistan, bin Laden was involved in selecting them for the plot and assigned Atta to be its leader.

At the time, Khalid Sheikh Mohammed led al-Qaeda's 'military committee'.  He provided operational support, such as selecting targets, and helped to arrange travel for the hijackers.  Khalid Sheikh Mohammed explained to Fouda, "We had a large surplus of brothers willing to die as martyrs. As we studied various targets, nuclear facilities arose as a key option"...but the nuclear targets were dropped for concerns the plan would "get out of hand."

Hamburg cell
Mohammed Atta, Ramzi bin al-Shibh, Marwan al-Shehhi and Ziad Jarrah came into the picture in 1999, when they arrived in Kandahar from Germany.  The Hamburg cell was formed in 1998 shortly after Atta received Al-Qaeda leadership approval for his plot. Mohamed Atta, Marwan al-Shehhi, Ziad Jarrah, Ramzi bin al-Shibh, Said Bahaji, Zakariyah Essabar, and fifteen others were all members.

Mohammed Atta was religious, but not fanatically so, when he came to Germany in Fall 1992 to study urban planning at the Technical University of Hamburg. While in Germany, he was drawn to Al Quds Mosque in Hamburg, which then adhered to a "harsh, uncompromisingly fundamentalist, resoundingly militant" version of Sunni Islam.  A friend of Atta's recalled meeting him at the Al-Quds mosque in 1993, though it is unknown when he began going there. Atta had lived as a strict Muslim, but after making a pilgrimage to Mecca in 1995, he returned to Germany more fanatical than before. In late 1997, Mohamed Atta told his roommate that he was going to Mecca, but likely he went to Afghanistan instead. According to Al Jazeera journalist Yosri Fouda, Atta went to the mosque around this time "not to pray but to sign his death will."  He was known to have attended Al-Qaeda training camps in Afghanistan in 1999 and 2000.

Ramzi bin al-Shibh, also known as "Ramzi Omar", was a Yemeni citizen. In 1995, he came to Germany seeking asylum, claiming to be a political refugee from Sudan. The judge, however, refused his request for asylum, so bin al-Shibh returned to Yemen's Hadramawt region. Bin al-Shibh later obtained a German visa under his real name and came to Germany in 1997.  There, he met Mohammed Atta, the Hamburg cell's leader, at a mosque. For two years, Atta and bin al-Shibh roomed together in Germany. In late 1999, bin al-Shibh traveled to Kandahar, Afghanistan, where he trained at Al-Qaeda training camps, and met others involved in planning the 9/11 attacks. Initial plans for the 9/11 attacks called for bin al-Shibh to be a hijacker pilot, along with Mohammed Atta, Marwan al-Shehhi, and Ziad Jarrah. From Hamburg, Germany, bin al-Shibh applied for flight training in the U.S. Concurrently, he applied to Aviation Language Services, which provided language training for student pilots. Bin al-Shibh applied four times for an entry visa to the U.S., but was refused each time. He made visa applications in Germany on May 17, 2000, and again in June, on September 16, and October 25, 2000. According to the 9/11 Commission, this visa refusal came out of general concern by U.S. officials that people from Yemen would illegally overstay their visit and seek work in the U.S. Bin al-Shibh's friend, Zakariyah Essabar, was also denied visas repeatedly. After his failure to enter the U.S., bin al-Shibh assumed more of a "coordinator" role in the plot and as a link between Atta in the U.S. and Khalid Sheikh Mohammed in Afghanistan.

Marwan al-Shehhi came to Bonn, Germany, in 1996 on a scholarship from the United Arab Emirates Army to study marine engineering. Al-Shehhi met Atta in 1997, and in 1998 moved to Hamburg to join Atta and bin al-Shibh. As the son of a religiously trained father, al-Shehhi was religious, well-educated in Islam, and adhered to a strict form of the faith. He had a friendlier, more humorous personality than Atta, however, who was serious and more reclusive.

Ziad Jarrah came from Lebanon to Germany in April 1996, where he enrolled in a junior college in Greifswald. There, he met his girlfriend, Aysel Senguen, a medical student. By late 1996, Jarrah's religious views grew radical. In September 1997, he transferred to the Technical University of Hamburg to study aircraft engineering. That summer he worked at a paint shop factory for Volkswagen in Wolfsburg.

Other Hamburg cell members included Said Bahaji, who came to Germany in 1995. He had been born there, but moved to Morocco at age nine. In 1996, Said Bahaji enrolled in the electrical engineering program at the technical university. He spent weekdays at a student home and weekends at his aunt Barbara Arens's home. Arens, his "high tech aunt", stopped the weekend visits on realizing that his religious beliefs had become more radical.

Selection for September 11 plot
In 1999, this group decided to go to Chechnya to fight. While still in Germany, they met Khalid al Masri who put the group in contact with Abu Musab in Duisburg, Germany. Abu Musab turned out to be Mohamedou Ould Slahi.  Slahi advised them that it would be difficult to enter Chechnya and advised them instead to go to Afghanistan first for training. In late 1999, the Hamburg group met with bin Laden, and pledged loyalty to him.  They agreed to undertake a highly secret mission, and were told to enroll in flight training. Atta was selected by bin Laden to lead the group. Bin Laden met with Atta several more times for additional instructions. The hijacker selection was entirely decided by bin Laden and Mohammed Atef. The hijackers had not yet met with Khalid Sheikh Mohammed. At the time, the hijacking team also included Nawaf al-Hazmi and Khalid al-Mihdhar, who were selected in early 1999 by bin Laden.

Atta, al-Shehhi, and Jarrah all obtained new passports, claiming that their old ones were lost, before applying for U.S. visas. Atta, Jarrah, and bin al-Shibh returned to Hamburg early in 2000, while al-Shehhi went back to the United Arab Emirates to obtain a new passport and a U.S. visa. Once back in Germany, they made efforts to appear less radical: they distanced themselves from others, stopped attending extremist mosques, and changed their appearances and behaviors.

Arrival in the United States
Al-Mihdhar and al-Hazmi arrived in Los Angeles on January 15, 2000. On January 18, Marwan al-Shehhi applied for a visa into the U.S. while he was in the United Arab Emirates. He was the first member of the Hamburg cell to apply for a visa.

By the end of June, Atta, Jarrah, and al-Shehhi left for the U.S. Bin al-Shibh and Essabar wanted to join Atta, al-Shehhi, and Jarrah, but were denied U.S. visas several times. Bin al-Shibh's visa was denied since he was a Yemeni citizen. He made several more attempts to obtain a U.S. visa. One such attempt was a $2,200 deposit he sent to the Florida Flight Training Center as a down payment for a similar training course taken by Ziad Jarrah. He used that application as a basis for a new attempt to get a student visa, rather than the visitor visa he previously had sought. On another occasion, he arranged for several thousand dollars to be deposited in his Yemeni bank account, to demonstrate financial wherewithal. After his final attempt failed, he was advised by a consular official that they could not help him, and to stop trying. At that point bin al-Shibh decided to support the cell by sending money to it. Mohammed was making repeated trips to Indonesia and the Philippines in Southeast Asia at the time. Jarrah nearly abandoned his role in the plot and probably would have been replaced by Zacarias Moussaoui had he done so.

A man named Omar al-Bayoumi had been in San Diego, California, since 1995. He was raising a family and received a monthly stipend from his former employer, an aviation company in Saudi Arabia. He was seen regularly videotaping various locations. Al-Bayoumi also was quick to house immigrants who needed housing. In 2000, he settled in Nawaf al-Hazmi and Khalid al-Mihdhar. According to al-Hazmi, al-Bayoumi met him and al-Mihdhar at a restaurant in Los Angeles. Al-Bayoumi offered a ride to San Diego after he heard the men speak Arabic. Al-Bayoumi threw the men a welcome party and al-Hazmi, who said he was in the U.S. to learn English, signed a six-month lease. He often surfed the Internet from the San Diego State University Library.

The first two months of the lease were paid for, yet the men complained that the lease was too expensive. In the spring, al-Hazmi told a friend that someone was going to wire $5,000 to him, and that the money would come from Saudi Arabia. Al-Hazmi told his friend that he had no account. The friend allowed him to use his account, and later found that the money came from a man named "Ali", and that it did not originate in the U.S. The two wanted to take flight lessons, which is why they got the money. A friend took them to Montgomery Field and arranged lessons for them. They took a single flight lesson but did not return. Fereidoun "Fred" Sorbi, the instructor, recalled, "The first day they came in here, they said they want to fly Boeings. We said you have to start slower. You can't just jump right into Boeings."

Al-Hazmi had season passes to the San Diego Zoo and SeaWorld. The men frequented a men's club in San Diego called Cheetah's near the Islamic Center. Al-Mihdhar and al-Hazmi frequently drove to Las Vegas in the Toyota sedan they bought.

Flight training
In March 2000, Mohamed Atta contacted the Academy of Lakeland in Florida by e-mail to inquire about flight training, "Dear sir, we are a small group of young men from different Arab countries. Now we are living in Germany since a while for study purposes. We would like to start training for the career of airline professional pilots. In this field we haven't yet any knowledge but we are ready to undergo an intensive training program (up to ATP and eventually higher)."  He sent 50–60 similar e-mails to other flight training schools in the U.S.

On May 18, 2000, Atta applied for and received a U.S. visa.  After obtaining his visa, Atta traveled to Prague before going to the U.S. Atta, along with Marwan al-Shehhi and Ziad Jarrah arrived in Venice, Florida, and visited Huffman Aviation to "check out the facility." They explained that "they came from a flight school in the area, they were not happy and they were looking for another flight school". By December, Atta and al-Shehhi left Huffman Aviation, and on December 21, Atta received a pilot license. Jarrah had left Huffman Aviation on January 15, 2001, a month after Atta and Al-Shehhi had done so.

Final preparations
About three weeks before the attacks, the targets were assigned to four teams. The United States Capitol was called "The Faculty of Law". The Pentagon was dubbed "The Faculty of Fine Arts". Mohammed Atta codenamed the World Trade Center "The Faculty of Town Planning".

Financial support
The 9/11 Commission stated in its final report that the "9/11 plotters eventually spent somewhere between $400,000 and $500,000 to plan and conduct their attack" but the "origin of the funds remains unknown." The Commission noted: "we have seen no evidence that any foreign government-or foreign government official-supplied any funding."

CNN claimed in October 2001 that U.S. investigators believed Ahmed Omar Saeed Sheikh (Ahmed Umar Syed Sheikh), using the alias Mustafa Muhammad Ahmad, sent over $100,000 from Pakistan to Mohamed Atta, the suspected hijack ringleader of the September 11 attacks.

"Investigators said Atta then distributed the funds to conspirators in Florida in the weeks before the deadliest acts of terrorism on U.S. soil that destroyed the World Trade Center, heavily damaged the Pentagon and left thousands dead [...] Syed also is described as a key figure in the funding operation of Al-Qaeda, the network headed by suspected terrorist mastermind Osama bin Laden."

The Pittsburgh Tribune noted that "There are many in Musharraf's government who believe that Saeed Sheikh's power comes not from the ISI, but from his connections with our own CIA."

CNN later confirmed that it was "Ahmed Umar Syed Sheikh,  authorities say used a pseudonym to wire $100,000 to suspected hijacker Mohammad Atta, who then distributed the money in the United States."

Soon after the money transfer was discovered, the head of Pakistan's Inter-Services Intelligence, Gen. Mahmood (Mahmud) Ahmed, resigned from his position. Indian news outlets reported the Federal Bureau of Investigation (FBI) was investigating the possibility that Gen. Mahmood Ahmed ordered Saeed Sheikh to send the $100,000 to Atta, while most Western media outlets only reported his connections to the Taliban as the reason for his departure from the ISI.

The Wall Street Journal was one of few Western news organizations to follow up on the story, citing the Times of India: "U.S. authorities sought [Gen. Mahmud Ahmed's] removal after confirming the fact that $100,000 [was] wired to WTC hijacker Mohamed Atta from Pakistan by Ahmad Umar Sheikh at the insistence of Gen Mahmud." The Daily Excelsior reported, "The FBI’s examination of the hard disk of the cellphone company Omar Sheikh had subscribed to led to discovery of the "link" between him and the deposed chief of the Pakistani ISI, Gen. Mehmood Ahmed. And as the FBI investigators delved deeper, sensational information surfaced with regard to the transfer of $100,000 to Mohamed Atta, one of the pilots who flew a Boeing into the World Trade Center. Gen. Mehmood Ahmed, the FBI investigators found, fully knew about the transfer of money to Atta."

According to The Washington Post, "on the morning of Sept. 11, [Porter] Goss and [Bob] Graham were having breakfast with a Pakistani general named Mahmud Ahmed the soon-to-be-sacked head of Pakistan's intelligence service" On September 12 and 13, Lt. Gen. Mahmood met with United States Deputy Secretary of State Richard Armitage, Senator Joseph Biden, the Chairman of the Senate Foreign Relations Committee, and Secretary of State Colin Powell. An agreement on Pakistan's collaboration in the new "war on terror" was negotiated between Mahmood and Armitage.

Lt. Gen. Mehmood Ahmed then led a six-member delegation to the Afghan city of Kandahar in order to hold crisis talks with the Taliban leadership, supposedly in an attempt to persuade them to hand over Osama bin Laden.

In June 2001, a "high-placed member of a U.S. intelligence agency" told BBC reporter Greg Palast that "after the [2000] elections, the agencies were told to "back off" investigating the bin Ladens and Saudi royals".

In May 2002, former FBI agent Robert Wright, Jr. delivered a tearful press conference apologizing to the families who lost loved ones on September 11. He described how his superiors intentionally obstructed his investigation into Al-Qaeda financing.

Agent Wright later told ABC's Brian Ross: "September 11th is a direct result of the incompetence of the FBI's International Terrorism Unit", specifically referring to the bureau's hindering of his investigation into Yasin al-Qadi, whom Ross described as a powerful Saudi Arabian businessman with extensive financial ties in Chicago. One month after September 11, the U.S. government officially identified Yassin al-Qadi as one of Osama bin Laden's primary financiers and a Specially Designated Global Terrorist.

In an interview with Computerworld Magazine, a former business associate described his relationship with al-Qadi: "I met him a few times and talked to him a few times on the telephone. He never talked to me about violence. Instead, he talked very highly of his relationship with [former President] Jimmy Carter and [Vice President] Dick Cheney."

The Muwafaq Foundation, which U.S. authorities confirmed was an arm of bin Laden's terror organization, was headed by Yassin al-Qadi, who was also known as the owner of Ptech a company that has supplied high-tech computer systems to the FBI, the Internal Revenue Service, the United States Congress, the United States Army, the Navy, the Air Force, the North Atlantic Treaty Organization, the Federal Aviation Administration (FAA), and the White House. Matthew Levitt, a former FBI counter-terrorism agent, commented: "For someone like [al-Qadi] to be involved in a capacity, in an organization, a company that has access to classified information, that has access to government open or classified computer systems, would be of grave concern." Also sitting on Ptech's board of directors was Yacub Mirza "a senior official of major radical Islamic organizations that had been linked by the U.S. government to terrorism." In addition, Hussein Ibrahim, the Vice President and Chief Scientist of Ptech, was vice chairman of a defunct investment group called BMI, a company the FBI had named as a conduit used by al-Qadi to launder money to Hamas militants.

According to Senator Bob Graham, then-chairman of the Senate Intelligence Committee from June 2001 through the buildup to the Iraq war, "Two of the Sept. 11, 2001, hijackers had a support network in the U.S. that included agents of the Saudi government, and the Bush administration and FBI blocked a congressional investigation into that relationship", as reported by the Miami Herald:
"And in Graham's book, Intelligence Matters, obtained by The Herald Saturday, he made clear that some details of that financial support from Saudi Arabia were in the 27 pages of the congressional inquiry's final report that the administration blocked from release, despite pleas from leaders of both parties on the House and Senate intelligence committees."

References

External links
 
 

September 11 attacks
Hamburg cell